Ālenush Teriān (November 9, 1921 – March 4, 2011), was an Iranian-Armenian astronomer and physicist and is called 'Mother of Modern Iranian Astronomy'.

Early life
She was born on November 9, 1921 to an Armenian family in Tehran, Iran. Her father, Arto, was a stage director, poet and translator (with the pen name Arizad meaning Born to Aryan) who had translated Shahnameh, from Persian to Armenian. Her mother, Varto Terian, was a stage actress and director.

Education
Teriān graduated in 1947 in the Science Department of University of Tehran. She began her career in the physics laboratory of this university and was elected the chief of laboratory operations in the same year.

She signed for scholarship to study in France but Dr. Hesabi didn't accept it. He believed it's already enough for a woman to study this much. At last she left Iran for France, by her father's financial support, where in 1956 she obtained her doctorate in atmospheric physics from Sorbonne University. Upon this she returned to Iran and became assistant professor in thermodynamics at University of Tehran. Later she worked in solar physics in the then West Germany for a period of four months through a scholarship that was awarded by the German government to University of Tehran. In 1964 Teriān became the first female professor of physics in Iran.

In 1966, Teriān became a member of the Geophysics Committee of the University of Tehran. In 1969 she was elected chief of the solar physics studies at this university and began to work in the solar observatory, of which she was one of the founders. Teriān retired in 1979. At the time of her death she was living in Tehran.

Teriān's 90th birthday celebration in Tehran was attended by a number of Iranian parliamentarians and over 100 Iranian Armenians.

Terian died on March 4, 2011, at the age of 90.

See also
Iranian women
Iranian Armenians

References

External links 
 Photographs of the 90th-year birthday ceremony of Professor Ālenush Teriān in Tehran, Mehr News Agency, 9 November 2010.

1921 births
2011 deaths
20th-century women scientists
Armenian astronomers
Iranian astronomers
Armenian physicists
Iranian physicists
Armenian academics
Iranian women scientists
Women astronomers
Iranian people of Armenian descent
Academic staff of the University of Tehran
University of Paris alumni
University of Tehran alumni
Burials at Doulab Cemetery